Alexander County is a county established in the U.S. state of North Carolina in 1847. As of the 2020 census, the population was 36,444. Its county seat is Taylorsville. Alexander County is part of the Hickory–Lenoir–Morganton, NC Metropolitan Statistical Area.

History
Alexander County was formed in 1847 from portions of what were then Iredell (formed in 1788 from Rowan County), Caldwell (formed from Burke County in 1841), and Wilkes (formed from Surry County and Washington District in 1771) counties.

Alexander County was named for William Julius Alexander who was a Speaker of the North Carolina House of Commons.  This Piedmont area was settled primarily by farmers, many of Scots-Irish descent, as well as German descent in the southern section of Alexander County.
The county was established by two acts of the North Carolina General Assembly, one ratified on January 15 and one ratified on January 18, 1847. These acts were not to take effect until it was determined that Caldwell County would have 5,000 people in it. On August 10–11, 1847, the first sale of land in the county seat (Taylorsville) took place.  Taylorsville is the namesake of either John Louis Taylor, Carolina agriculturist and political philosopher, or General Zachary Taylor, the twelfth president of the United States.
With the proceeds from the sale, the county built the first courthouse on the present site.

When the American Civil War began in 1861, Alexander County was fourteen years old. The court house records in Taylorsville were destroyed by troops under Major General George Stoneman in a raid on Easter Sunday in 1865.

The Alexander Railroad based in Taylorsville began in 1946, with one connection to Norfolk Southern in Statesville, North Carolina. The short line rail system operates between Taylorsville and Statesville.

Geography

Alexander County is located within the Foothills region of western North Carolina. The county's main geographic feature is the Brushy Mountains, a deeply eroded spur of the Blue Ridge Mountains to the west. Barrett Mountain, an isolated mountain ridge, is in the western part of the county. The remainder of Alexander County's terrain consists of gently rolling countryside. The county's largest river, the Catawba, forms its southern border.

Within Alexander County is the unincorporated town of Hiddenite, the location of a mine that yields emeralds, sapphires, and its namesake stone "hiddenite," a variety of spodumene.

The county is served by US Highway 64, a controlled-access roadway connecting Taylorsville with Lenoir and Statesville. NC Highways 90, 16, and 127 also serve the county. Interstate 40 and 77 are 30 minutes from the majority of county residents. The Charlotte Douglas International Airport is an hour's drive from most parts of the county. The area is also served by the Hickory Regional Airport (30 minutes) and the Statesville Airport (20 minutes). The Alexander Railroad Company is an active short-line rail system operating between Taylorsville and Statesville, and connecting with Norfolk Southern.

State and local protected area 
 Rocky Face Mountain Recreational Area

Major water bodies 
 Catawba River
 Cub Creek
 Duck Creek
 Elk Shoals Creek
 Grassy Creek (Elkin Creek tributary)
 Lake Hickory
 Lookout Shoals Lake
 Lower Little River
 Middle Little River
 Mill Creek
 Muddy Fork
 Rink Lake
 Rock Creek
 Rocky Creek
 Shuford Pond
 South Yadkin River
 Spring Creek
 Third Creek
 Wallace Creek
 White Creek

Adjacent counties
 Wilkes County - north
 Iredell County - east
 Catawba County - south
 Caldwell County - west

Major highways
 
 
  (Truck Route)

Major infrastructure
 The county is served by one railroad, the Alexander Railroad Company.

Demographics

2020 census

As of the 2020 United States census, there were 36,444 people, 14,169 households, and 10,232 families residing in the county.

2000 census
As of the census of 2000, there were 33,603 people, 13,137 households, and 9,747 families residing in the county.  The population density was 129 people per square mile (50/km2).  There were 14,098 housing units at an average density of 54 per square mile (21/km2).  The racial makeup of the county was 92.00% White, 4.63% Black or African American, 0.15% Native American, 1.04% Asian, 1.34% from other races, and 0.84% from two or more races.  2.50% of the population were Hispanic or Latino of any race.

There were 13,137 households, out of which 32.80% had children under the age of 18 living with them, 60.50% were married couples living together, 9.40% had a female householder with no husband present, and 25.80% were non-families. 21.90% of all households were made up of individuals, and 8.40% had someone living alone who was 65 years of age or older.  The average household size was 2.54 and the average family size was 2.95.

In the county, the population was spread out, with 24.50% under the age of 18, 7.90% from 18 to 24, 31.10% from 25 to 44, 24.60% from 45 to 64, and 11.90% who were 65 years of age or older.  The median age was 37 years. For every 100 females there were 99.40 males.  For every 100 females age 18 and over, there were 96.70 males.

The median income for a household in the county was $38,684, and the median income for a family was $45,691. Males had a median income of $29,857 versus $21,868 for females. The per capita income for the county was $18,507.  About 5.90% of families and 8.50% of the population were below the poverty line, including 10.20% of those under age 18 and 14.60% of those age 65 or over.

Government and politics
Alexander is currently a powerfully Republican county in Presidential elections. The only Democrat to carry the county in the past nineteen Presidential contests has been Jimmy Carter in 1976, although Barry Goldwater won the county by a mere thirty-eight votes in 1964. In contrast, Hillary Clinton in 2016 obtained barely twenty percent of the county's vote. The county did vote mainly Democratic during the Third Party System, but Populist sentiments in the 1890s have meant the county has supported the party only five times since 1896.

Alexander County is a member of the regional Western Piedmont Council of Governments.

Communities

Town
 Taylorsville (county seat, since 1847):  First post master was Alexander C. McIntosh.  Post office since 11/26/1847.  Formerly called James Cross Roads in Iredell County prior to 1847.

Townships
By the requirements of the North Carolina Constitution of 1868, counties were divided into non-functioning county subdivisions called townships.  There are eight townships in Alexander County:
 Ellendale
 Gwaltneys
 Little River
 Millers
 Sharpes
 Sugar Loaf
 Taylorsville
 Wittenburg

Census-designated places
 Bethlehem (largest community)
 Hiddenite:  First postmaster was Quintis C. Patterson.  Post office since February 10, 1888.
 Stony Point:  First postmaster was John A. Murchison.  Post office since October 21, 1847.

Unincorporated communities
Unincorporated communities in Alexander County include:
 Drumstand: Site of Drumstand community building
 Ellendale: The first postmaster was William S. McLeod. Post office from July 1, 1880, to January 30, 1904.
 Little River: The first postmaster was Burton Reid. Post office from November 10, 1852, to September 15, 1906.  1841 to 1847 part of Caldwell County, part of Burke County before 1841.
 Millersville
 Sugar Loaf
 Vashti: The first postmaster was Humphrey T. Cambell. Post office from February 12, 1886, to March 31, 1903.
 Wittenburg(s): The first postmaster was Joseph B. Bradburn.  Post office from May 31, 1848, to March 15, 1909.  Before 1847, part of Caldwell County.

Population ranking
The population of cities, towns, and Census Designated Places (CDP) is shown in the following table is based on the 2022 estimate of Alexander County.

Historic post offices and other sites
Historical post offices that were part of Alexander County include:
 Mount Pisgah:  First postmaster was Reuben O. Bennett. Post office from April 9, 1849, to April 15, 1909.
 Elk Shoal:  First postmaster was Ephraim M. Alexander.  Post office from March 5, 1852, to November 26, 1852.  Post office changed to Elk Shoal #2 on September 27, 1858, with David M. Moore as post master. Became part of Iredell County in 1868.  Changed to Elk Shoal #3 in 1881 and became part of Alexander County.  New postmaster was Nicholas L. Norton on August 4, 1881.  Post office discontinued on January 15, 1901.
 York Collegiate Institute: First postmaster was Richard W. York.  Post office from December 13, 1855, to April 2, 1859.  Name was changed to Montane Female Academy on April 2, 1859, with Thaddeus L. Troy as postmaster until November 28, 1859, when the name was changed back to York Collegiate Institute with Harrison L. Smith as postmaster.   Post office discontinued on December 4, 1903.
 Salem Grove:  First postmaster was William W. Teague.  Post office lasted from August 7 to August 9, 1872.
 Jumping Run:  First postmaster was James F. Gryder.  Post office from August 15, 1871, to October 15, 1872.
 Cedar Run:  First postmaster was John H. Ellis.  Post office from February 9, 1876, to September 14, 1903.
 Little River: First postmaster was Burton Reid.  Post office from November 10, 1952, to September 15, 1906.  Formerly in Burke County before 1841 and Caldwell County in 1841.
 Mount Bethel: First postmaster was Adam P. Bohick.  Post office from May 8, 1876, to March 15, 1913.
 Barnetts Mountain:  First postmaster was David L. Mitchell.  Post office from December 29, 1876, to April 13, 1881.
 Kilby:  First postmaster was Leander R. Goforth.  Post office from May 3, 1880, to May 15, 1905.
 Pilgrim:  First postmaster was William E. Millsope.  Post office from June 30, 1880, to October 15, 1882.
 Bentley: First postmaster was William W. Teague.  Post office from January 24, 1881, to September 30, 1941.
 Hedrick:  First postmaster was Edward L. Hedrick.  Post office from October 7, 1881, to September 30, 1903.
 Broad Shoals:  First postmaster was Thomas Little.   Post office from October 31, 1881, to November 15, 1904.
 Grade:  First postmaster was John P. Brewer.  Post office from June 11, 1882, to May 15, 1900.  Originally Iredell County and became Alexander County in 1888.

Other historic sites

 Old Jail Museum:  1919 jail in Taylorsville, now a museum
 Lucas Mansion: Restored turn of the century home of James "Diamond Jim" Lucas in Hiddenite Center
 Friendship Church: Lutheran and Evangelical church organized in 1833, near Taylorsville
 Linney's Mill: Built in 1790 by Richard Cook.  Located on the northeast corner of Alexander County, it is still operational.
 Little River Baptist Church: first association meeting in 1771 (in what became Alexander County in 1847), church erected in 1786, originally called "Old Meeting House"

See also
 List of counties in North Carolina
 National Register of Historic Places listings in Alexander County, North Carolina
 List of Highway Historical Markers in Alexander County, North Carolina
 :Category:People from Alexander County, North Carolina

References

Further reading

External links

 
 

 
Charlotte metropolitan area
Western North Carolina